Kolyshkino is a rural locality (a village) in Novlenskoye Rural Settlement, Vologodsky District, Vologda Oblast, Russia. The population was 23 as of 2002.

Geography 
Kolyshkino is located 80 km northwest of Vologda (the district's administrative centre) by road. Popovo is the nearest rural locality.

References 

Rural localities in Vologodsky District